There are two Grammar schools named after Simon Langton, both based in Canterbury, Kent:

 Simon Langton Grammar School for Boys
 Simon Langton Girls' Grammar School